Denis L. Rousseau (signing papers as D. L. Rousseau) is an American scientist.  He is currently Professor and University Chairman of the department of Physiology and Biophysics at Albert Einstein College of Medicine.

Biography
Rousseau is professor and University Chairman of Physiology and Biophysics at the Albert Einstein College of Medicine, of Yeshiva University, a position he has held since 1996. He received his B.A. from Bowdoin College and received his Ph.D. in physical chemistry from Princeton University.  After holding a position as research associate in the Physics Department at the University of Southern California, studying with Sergio Porto, he joined AT&T Bell Laboratories in 1969.

Research
In the 1970s, he used infrared spectroscopy to demonstrate that what was thought to be a newly discovered form of water, polywater, was structurally similar to human sweat.  This result suggested that the novel properties of polywater were due to contamination from biological impurities, and later described the proposal of polywater as an example of Pathological science.  He is also a pioneer in using resonance Raman spectroscopy to study heme proteins, notably hemoglobin, Cytochrome c oxidase, Nitric oxide synthase, and the folding of cytochrome c.

Significant publications

References

External links
Rousseau Laboratory

Bowdoin College alumni
People from New Hampshire
American biophysicists
American physical chemists
Princeton University alumni
University of Southern California faculty
Yeshiva University faculty
Living people
Year of birth missing (living people)